"Wolf at the Door" is a song by the rock band Keane.

Wolf at the Door may also refer to:
 Wolf at the Door (album), a 1991 album by Walter "Wolfman" Washington
 A Wolf at the Door (film), a 2013 Brazilian film
 "A Wolf at the Door", a song by Radiohead from Hail to the Thief
 The Wolf at the Door, a 1986 Danish-French film
 The Wolf at the Door: A Poetic Cycle, a book by Bogomil Ǵuzel